Elaeocarpus thorelii is a tree in the family Elaeocarpaceae, endemic to Cambodia, and used for its wood.

Description and habitat
The species grows 10-15m tall in dense/closed forests. It has rough bark.
On the Bokor Plateau of Preah Monivong Bokor National Park, Cambodia, the plant is a rare small tree, found at about 970m elevation.

Distribution
It is endemic to Cambodia, most commonly in the provinces of Kompong Speu and Kompong Chhnang.

Vernacular names
Elaeocarpus thorelii is called krâmâr in Khmer, the name is an allusion to its rough bark.

Uses
The wood of the tree is used in construction and as firewood.

History
The French botanist Jean Baptiste Louis Pierre, who specialised in Asian flora, described the plant in his Flore Forestiere de la Cochinchine in 1885.

References

Further reading

Dy Phon, P. (2000). Dictionnaire des plantes utilisées au Cambodge: 1–915. chez l'auteur, Phnom Penh, Cambodia.
Govaerts, R. (2001). World Checklist of Seed Plants Database in ACCESS E-F: 1–50919.

thorelii
Endemic flora of Cambodia
Plants described in 1885